Beylagan District is one of the 66 districts of Azerbaijan. It is located in the centre of the country and belongs to the Central Aran Economic Region. The district borders the districts of Fuzuli, Aghjabadi, Zardab, Imishli, and the Ardabil Province of Iran. Its capital and largest city is Beylagan. As of 2020, the district had a population of 99,500.

Etymology 
The name Beylagan historically used in different forms particularly, Paytakaran, Balasakan, Bilgan, Millar and Beylagan. A number of considerations associated with the toponymy of Beylagan. In accordance with the historical name “Beylagan” derived from the words “pila” (valley) and “gan” (place) and corresponds to the meaning of field or valley.

Another view claims that Beylagan historically situated on the Barda – Ardabil trade way. Because of that reason, the city became one of the main trade centres in the 9th – 12th centuries. The toponymy “Beylagan” interrelated to that historical base, which means trade way or the place where trading took place. According to the other statements the toponymy is related to the name of the “bel” tribe who lived there at that time. “Beylagan” means the place where “bel” tribes are settled regarding that view.

History 
There is mention of the name of the district in various historical books. One of the “Roads and Countries” is written by Naila Valikhanli. Dimensions of the main historical trade ways are indicated in that book. At the same time, an indication of the route from Greece to Beylagan shows the significance of the city. According to the sources, the north–south line (Derbent – Ardabil road) of the Silk Road passed through Beylagan. Traders of the city built relations with China, India, Iran, Georgia and Byzantium through thanks to this geophysical condition.

In accordance with the historical sources, Beylagan was founded in the 5th century. In the 13th century, the city was completely destroyed by Mongol invasions. Reconstruction of Beylagan started by Amir Teymur in the 14th century but after his death works in that territory stopped. Ancient Beylagan city was ruined in the 16th century and has never been restored again.

Beylagan district was founded on November 24, 1939, and was called Zhanov from 1939 to 1963. In 1963, the Beylagan District was liquidated and merged with the Imishli district. The name of the district was renamed Beylagan with regard to the 1989 dated decree of the Supreme Council of Azerbaijan SSR. The Center of the district is Beylagan city where got city status in 1966.

Geography 
Beylagan is one of the southwestern districts of Azerbaijan and situated in the Mil valley of the Kur – Araz lowland and in the middle of the Kur and Araz rivers. Geographical coordinates are 39°45’ North latitude and 47°30’ West longitude and bordering Agchabadi, Zardab, Imishli, Fuzuli districts and Iran Islamic Republic in the south-east. Some parts of the Harami plain belong to the district and the northeast part is below the ocean level. More than 40% of the territory is 0 – 100 meters, 25% is 100 – 200 meters and 35% is below 0 meters. Absolute altitude changes between 200 – 250 meters towards Harami plain. Generally, Beylagan is considered a seismic active zone.

The territory is completely plain. Relief is covered by sand, gravel and other sedimentary rocks belong to the Anthropogenic period of the Cenozoic era. 4th-period sedimentary rocks are widespread in the district. At the same time, all sedimentary minerals are found in the territory. There is found gravel, sand in the Harami and Arazboyu plains. Researches reveal that there are a lot of potable water resources in the Harami plain and they are partly used. Furthermore, the territory is used as a pasture.

Climate 
In the Köppen climate classification, Beylagan has a semi – arid climate with hot summers and mild winters. Geophysical location plays the main role in the formation of the climate. Thus, the area is constantly affected by cyclones and air flows come from tropics and Central Asia. The average annual temperature is 14 °C. January is characterized by an average 1,8 °C and the average temperature is 26 °C in July.

Flora and fauna 
Indigenous flora is characterized by semi-arid plants. The coastal area of the Kur river is covered by poplars, mulberry, cypress trees and tugai forests in a small area.

Gazelle, fox, boar, wolf, grey rabbit are characteristic animals for the district. In the Tugai forests and swamp areas, there are found hedgehogs, wolves, boars, snakes, owls and woodpeckers. There are ducks, vessels and seagulls in the ponds.

Several indigenous species of plants and animals are protected in the Ag-Gol National Reserve where located in both Agchabadi and Beylagan districts. There are reserved especially migratory birds.

Architecture

Archaeological monuments 
Archaeological investigations in the district prove that people lived there more than six thousand years ago. There are several monuments registered by the Ministry of Culture and Tourism of Azerbaijan. They are Orangala (relicts of the ancient Beylagan city), Chardakli, Kultapa, Qaratapa, Saritapa, Chataltapa, Garaytapa, Tazakand, the first and second Sultanbud settlements, Saritapa, Sultanbud cemeteries and Beylagan tower.

Religious architecture 
Beylagan is the only district in Azerbaijan where the tomb of Prophet Charchis is situated. The tomb was built in the 17th – 18th centuries. Nowadays the tomb of Prophet Charchis is used as a religious sanctuary and people come there from various countries especially, Iran, Georgia and Middle East countries. There is also a mosque named after Prophet Charchis. Other mosques are Dunyamallar, Amina Khatun and Turkish mosques in the district.

Furthermore, there are some sanctuaries of sayyids such as Sayyid Aga, Sayyid Khirda, Sayyid Miryusif and Sayyid Ali Aga in Beylagan.

Statues 
There are a lot of statues in the district. Most of these statues are historical and notable people; Akif Akberov (National Hero of Azerbaijan), Garay Asedov (Hero of the Soviet Union), Hazi Aslanov (Hero of the Soviet Union), Nariman Narimanov (politician), Ilham Guliyev, Ilqar Gurbanov, Gadim Aliyev, Mehdi Mehdizadeh, Namig Allahverdiyev, Nazim Guliyev and Sevil Gaziyeva.

Monuments 
A list of important monuments of Beylagan includes the Labor Union monument, the March 31, Genocide monument complex of Azerbaijanis, the monument complex in memory of Karabakh war, the monument in memory of the Hero of Soviet Union Garay Asadov and the monument of Heydar Aliyev.

Economy 
Economy of Beylagan is characterized by agricultural activities especially cotton, vine, grain growing fields.

Demography 
According to the statistics in 2017, the population is 96,4 thousand people. The population of the district includes various nationalities.

People's settlement in urban areas is less than villages, respectively 42,16% and 57,84%.

According to the State Statistics Committee, as of 2018, the population of city recorded 97,500 persons, which increased by 18,700 persons (about 18.9 percent) from 79,000 persons in 2000. 49,400 of total population are men, 48,100 are women.

Notable natives 
Some of the district's notable residents include scientists, writers, sportsmen, heroes and musicians.

Scientists 
 Asgar Abdullayev
 Suleyman Aliyarli
 Maharram Aliyev
 Kamil Mammədov
 Elmira Zeynalova.

Hero of the Soviet Union 
 Garay Asadov

Heroes of Socialist Labour 
 Gulzar Abdullayeva
 Gulustan Agayeva
 Gullu Jabbarova
 Bahadur Huseynov
 Rashid Imanov
 Sardar Imraliyev
 Askinaz Usubova.

National Heroes of Azerbaijan 
 Namiq Allahverdiyev
 Akif Akbarov
 Matlab Guliyev
 Nazim Guliyev

Writers 
 Aga Savalanli
 Zakir Aliyev
 Ibrahim Kabirli
 Islam Kabirli
 Iltizam Rustamov
 Tamara Valiyeva
 Vaqif Jafarli
 Yusif Nagmakar
 Zulfuqar Shahsevanli

Sportsmen 
 Zulfiyya Huseynova
 Shahin Diniyev

Other 
 Masud ibn Namndar
 Muciraddin Beylagani
 Nacmaddin Beylagani
 Shibaddin Beylagani

References

External links 

 
Districts of Azerbaijan